Wilfred Eade Agar FRS (27 April 1882 – 14 July 1951) was an Anglo-Australian zoologist.

Agar was born in Wimbledon, England. He was educated at Sedbergh School, Yorkshire, and at King's College, Cambridge, where he read zoology. He served at Gallipoli in World War I.

In 1919, he accepted the chair of zoology at the University of Melbourne; his notable projects concerned marsupial chromosomes and inheritance in cattle. He successfully challenged the Lamarckian findings of William McDougall relating to the inheritance of the effects of training in rats.

In 1938 Agar was elected president of the Eugenics Society of Victoria. He said "it was a disastrous state of affairs that size of families was usually in inverse ratio to intelligence."

Agar was awarded the Clarke Medal by the Royal Society of New South Wales in 1944 and elected a Foreign Member of the Royal Society.

Agar Street in the Canberra suburb of Bruce was dedicated in his name.

Agar was the author of the book A Contribution to the Theory of the Living Organism (1943). The book was based on the system of Whitehead's philosophy of the organism and argued for a form panpsychism.

Publications
Experiments on Inheritance in Parthenogenesis (1914)
Cytology: With Special Reference to the Metazoan Nucleus (1920)
Science and Human Welfare (1943)
A Contribution to the Theory of the Living Organism (1943, 1951)

References

External links

1882 births
1951 deaths
Alumni of King's College, Cambridge
Alumni of the University of Glasgow
Critics of Lamarckism
Fellows of the Royal Society
Panpsychism
People from Wimbledon, London
20th-century Australian zoologists